The Counterfeiters is a 1948 American crime film directed by Sam Newfield and written by Fred Myton and Barbara Worth. The film stars John Sutton, Doris Merrick, Hugh Beaumont, Lon Chaney, Jr., George O'Hanlon and Robert Kent. The film was released on May 28, 1948, by 20th Century Fox.

Plot

Cast   
John Sutton as Inspector Jeff MacAllister
Doris Merrick as Margo Talbot
Hugh Beaumont as Philip Drake
Lon Chaney, Jr. as Louie Struber 
George O'Hanlon as Frankie Dodge
Robert Kent as Tony Richards 
Herbert Rawlinson as Norman Talbot
Pierre Watkin as Carter 
Don C. Harvey as Dan Taggart 
Fred Coby as Piper
Joi Lansing as Caroline 
Scott Brady as Jerry McGee

References

External links 
 

1948 films
1940s English-language films
20th Century Fox films
American crime films
1948 crime films
Films directed by Sam Newfield
American black-and-white films
1940s American films